USS Oneota may refer to the following ships of the United States Navy:

 , a monitor built in Ohio for the American Civil War
 , a net laying ship built during World War II

United States Navy ship names